Jaime Rachel Renee Passier-Armstrong (born August 24, 1981) is a New Zealand actress. She is known for her role of Jay Copeland in the New Zealand's soap opera Shortland Street.

Early years
Passier-Armstrong was born in Queenstown, New Zealand. She began her professional career at the age of twelve on the TV series, "Plainclothes".

Career
In 2000, Passier-Armstrong was selected for the female lead role of Ripeka Bastion in the drama film Crooked Earth. In 2004, she joined the cast in New Zealand's top rating television soap opera series Shortland Street. She received a nomination for Best Actress in the TV Guide's Peoples Choice Awards for her role as Jay Copeland in the show. She also appeared in the bilingual drama television series Korero Mai.

Filmography

References

External links
 

1981 births
Living people
New Zealand soap opera actresses
New Zealand film actresses
20th-century New Zealand actresses
21st-century New Zealand actresses